UniCredit Bank Slovakia was a Slovak bank, formed by the merger of HVB Bank Slovakia and UniBanka in 2007, both owned by Italy-based UniCredit Group. In 2013 it was absorbed by UniCredit Bank Czech Republic, forming UniCredit Bank Czech Republic and Slovakia.

Predecessors

UniBanka
UniBanka, formerly known as Pol'nobanka, was a Slovak bank headquartered in Bratislava. An additional 51% shares was acquired from Slovenska Poistovna in May 2000 by UniCredit. European Bank for Reconstruction and Development was a minority shareholder of the bank, for 20% stake. Before the acquisition, UniCredit (at that time known as Unicredito Italiano) already owned 5.43% shares, which was previously owned by Unicredito.

HVB Bank Slovakia

References

Banks of Slovakia
Former UniCredit subsidiaries